Bifunctional methylenetetrahydrofolate dehydrogenase/cyclohydrolase, mitochondrial is an enzyme that in humans is encoded by the MTHFD2 gene.

This gene encodes a nuclear-encoded mitochondrial bifunctional enzyme with methylenetetrahydrofolate dehydrogenase and methenyltetrahydrofolate cyclohydrolase activities. The enzyme functions as a homodimer and is unique in its absolute requirement for magnesium and inorganic phosphate. Formation of the enzyme-magnesium complex allows binding of NAD. Alternative splicing results in multiple transcripts encoding different isoforms. This gene has a pseudogene on chromosome 7.

References

Further reading